The Anshun–Liupanshui intercity railway is a high-speed railway in China.

History
Construction began in 2015 and was originally expected to open in 2018. In fact, it opened on 8 July 2020.

Route
The line splits from the Changsha–Kunming high-speed railway south of Anshun West railway station and heads west. It travels parallel to the existing Shanghai–Kunming railway, which it joins west of Liupanshui East to reach its terminus, Liupanshui railway station.

Stations

References

High-speed railway lines in China
Railway lines opened in 2020